Albert Edward Smith (2 January 1881 – 5 February 1965) was an Australian politician. Born in Kent, England, he migrated to Australia as a child and was educated at Clare in South Australia. He became a service station proprietor and served on Clare Council. In 1943, he was elected to the Australian House of Representatives as the Labor member for Division of Wakefield, defeating the sitting United Australia Party member, Jack Duncan-Hughes. He held the seat until his defeat in 1946 by Philip McBride, the candidate for the UAP's successor, the Liberal Party. Smith died in 1965.

References

Australian Labor Party members of the Parliament of Australia
Members of the Australian House of Representatives for Wakefield
Members of the Australian House of Representatives
1881 births
1965 deaths
20th-century Australian politicians
British emigrants to Australia